"Tattoo" is a song recorded by American country music artist Hunter Hayes as the second single from his second studio album Storyline (2014). Hayes co-wrote the song in a collaboration with Troy Verges and Barry Dean, while the production was handled by Hayes and Dann Huff.  It was released to country radio through Atlantic Records on June 16, 2014 as the second single off the album. "Tattoo" was released as an extended play in the UK as Hayes' international musical debut on October 3, 2014, and was re-released as the second single from his international debut album, I Want Crazy (2015), on March 23, 2015.

Live performances
Hayes debuted the song at the 2014 CMT Music Awards on June 4, 2014.

Music video
The music video was directed by Kristin Barlowe and premiered on July 28, 2014.

Track listing
Digital download
"Tattoo" – 3:17

UK digital EP
"Tattoo" (UK version) – 3:21
"Invisible" (Acoustic) – 4:36
"Counting Stars" (Live) – 5:00

Chart performance
"Tattoo" debuted at No. 55 on the Billboard Country Airplay chart for the week ending June 14, 2014 on unsolicited airplay prior to its official release.

Year-end charts

Release history

References

2014 singles
Hunter Hayes songs
Songs written by Hunter Hayes
Songs written by Troy Verges
Songs written by Barry Dean (songwriter)
Song recordings produced by Dann Huff
Atlantic Records singles
2014 songs